Zeidler Architecture is an international architecture, interior design, urban design, and master planning firm with four Canadian offices located in Toronto, Calgary, Vancouver, and Victoria. In addition, the firm has locations in Beijing (China); and Berlin (Germany).

The firm began in 1880 in the City of Peterborough when William Blackwell established his practice there. Eberhard Zeidler joined Blackwell Jr. and partner Craig in 1951. The firm (renamed Craig, Zeidler and Strong) moved to Toronto in 1963. Senior partner emeritus, Eberhard Zeidler, stepped down from the firm in 2009. The firm is now led by a national senior leadership of 11 partners.

The firm's main body of work is located in Canada, with some projects in the United States, Europe, the Middle East and Asia.

Notable projects 
10 Lancelot Place in Knightsbridge, London, UK, completed in 2008
 Assuta Medical Center, Tel Aviv, Israel
 The Bow Encana, Calgary, Canada
 Brampton Civic Offices and Southwest Renewal, Brampton, Canada
 Calgary City Centre, Calgary Canada
 Camrose Performing Arts Theatre, Camrose, Canada
 Canada Place, Vancouver, Canada
 Canadian Diplomatic Complex, Seoul, South Korea
 St. Joseph's Health Centre West 5th Campus, St. Joseph's Hamilton, Canada
 Juravinski Hospital and Cancer Centre, Hamilton, Canada
 Living Arts Centre, Mississauga, Ontario
 McMaster University Health Sciences Centre, Hamilton, Canada
 Minto Midtown, Toronto, Ontario, Canada
 Mohawk College Learning Centre
 Mount Allison University Fine & Performing Arts Centre, Sackville, New Brunswick, Canada
 Ontario Place, Toronto, Ontario, Canada
 Ontario Science Centre OMNIMAX Cinema & Renovations, Toronto, Ontario, Canada
 Peel Memorial Hospital, Canada
 Place Montreal Trust, Montreal, Canada
 Princess Margaret Hospital / Ontario Cancer Institute, Toronto, Ontario, Canada
 Queen's Quay Terminal, Toronto, Ontario, Canada
 Rogers Building, Toronto, Ontario, Canada 
 Sheldon & Tracy Levy Student Learning Centre, Toronto, Ontario, Canada (by Snøhetta and Zeidler).
 Scripps Florida, Palm Beach County, USA
 The Hospital for Sick Children Atrium, Toronto, Ontario, Canada
 Toronto Eaton Centre, Toronto, Ontario, Canada
 Torre Mayor, Mexico City, Mexico
 Trump International Hotel and Tower (Toronto), Toronto, Ontario, Canada
 Union Station Revitalization: GO Trainshed Glass Roof, Toronto, Ontario, Canada
Toronto South Detention Centre complex
F. W. Woolworth Building (Toronto) restoration as 2 Queen West

Awards 
 2022 RAIC National Urban Design Awards, Award of Merit, Urban Fragments – CF Toronto Eaton Centre Bridge
 2021 Association of Registered Interior Designers of Ontario (ARIDO), Distinct Category – McCrum's Office Furnishings 
 2020 Canadian Architect Award of Excellence – Taza Water Reservoir
 2018 Heritage BC, Outstanding Achievement Award – Promis Block Seismic Upgrade
 2011 Canadian Architect Award of Excellence – Ryerson University Student Learning Centre
 2010 Ontario Association of Architects Landmark Award – Queen's Quay Terminal
 2010 International Academy of Health & Design Award Commendation – Assuta Medical Centre
 2009 Ontario Association of Architects Design Excellence Award for Belleville Public Library and John M. Parrott Art Gallery
 2009 Ontario Association of Architects Landmark Award – St. Lawrence Neighbourhood 1977-82
 2009 American Institute of Architects, Austin Honor Award – Long Center for the Performing Arts
 2008 Ontario Association of Architects Landmark Award – Toronto Eaton Centre
 2008 AIPC Apex Award – World's Best Convention Centre – Canada Place
 2008 American Institute of Architects (Eastern New York) - Design Honor Award - St. Joseph's Hamilton West 5th Campus
 2008 Canadian Society of Landscape Architects, National Honour Award - Canadian Diplomatic Complex
 2006 Design Exchange Interior Design Commercial - York University Accolade
 2006 Canadian Urban Institute Brownie Award, Best Large Scale Project - Halifax Seawall Redevelopment Master Plan
 2005 Canadian Urban Institute Brownie Award, Brownie Awards Finalist (Green Design and Technological Innovation) – Canada Marine Discovery Centre
 2001 Canadian Architect – Award of Excellence for Canada Place, Canary Wharf
 1999 Ontario Association of Architects – Architectural Excellence Award for National Trade Centre at Exhibition Place
 1997 Governor General's Medal – Award of Merit for the Columbus Center of Marine Research and Exploration

References

External links 

Architecture firms of Canada
Companies based in Toronto
Architecture firms